Esna Landscape Conservation Area is a nature park situated in Järva County, Estonia.

Its area is 226 ha.

The protected area was designated in 1972 to protect Esna Park and Esna Springs and its surrounding areas.In 2006, the protected area was redesigned to the landscape conservation area.

References

Nature reserves in Estonia
Geography of Järva County